Cliff is the 1959 debut album of British singer Cliff Richard and his band the Drifters (later known as the Shadows). The recording is the first white professionally recorded live rock and roll album.

The album is a live-in-the-studio recording of Richard's and the Shadows' early rock and roll in front of an invited audience of several hundred fans. It was recorded over two nights during February 1959 in Studio 2 at EMI Recording Studios (later known as Abbey Road Studios) with Norrie Paramor as producer. 

The album contains renderings of Richard's hit single "Move It", both tracks of the yet to be released Drifters' instrumental single "Jet Black" and "Driftin'" and covers of rock 'n' roll standards made famous by Elvis Presley, Buddy Holly, Little Richard, Jerry Lee Lewis, Roy Orbison, Ricky Nelson, Ritchie Valens and Gene Vincent.

The album reached number 4 in the UK album chart and spent 31 weeks on the chart - a time when the chart was only a top ten.

Release
The album was released originally in mono only (Columbia 33 SX 1147) but was also released in two parts as 45rpm EPs (Cliff No.1 and Cliff No.2 in both mono and stereo. Both versions use the same takes but with slightly different audience noise.

The album was repackaged with the title Dance with Cliff Richard for release in France (Columbia 33 FPX 185).

The album was first released on CD in 1987 (EMI CDP 7482772) in the original mono version. It was reissued in 1998 (EMI 495 4382) with both the mono and stereo versions on the same disc. It was also released in 2001 (EMI 534 6002) with the stereo version only along with the stereo version of the follow-up album Cliff Sings as part of the 2 on 1 series.

Track listing

Notes:
A  Refers to the original name of UK band, the Shadows, as they were known from August 1958 until October 1959 (when "Travellin' Light" was released). The UK band are not be confused with the US band of the same name.

Unreleased tracks
Some tracks were scheduled or recorded for the album but not included. A version of Elvis Presley's "One Night" recorded in the same session was later released on The Rock 'N' Roll Years 1958-1963 (1997). Two other tracks were recorded but not released - Conway Twitty's "It's Only Make Believe" and The Weavers' "Kisses Sweeter than Wine" (which had been a hit in the UK in 1958 for Frankie Vaughan).

Personnel
Cliff Richard and the Drifters
Cliff Richard – lead vocals
Hank Marvin – lead guitar
Bruce Welch - rhythm guitar
Jet Harris – bass guitar
Tony Meehan – drums

Additional musicians
Mike Sammes Singers – background vocals ("Donna" and "Danny")

Production
Produced by Norrie Paramor
Engineered by Malcolm Addey

External links
 Retrospective review: Classic Album: Cliff - Cliff Richard and the Drifters by Randy Fox, 19 July 2020, Vintage Rock, vintagerockmag.com
 Allmusic review:  by Bruce Eder

References

Cliff Richard albums
The Shadows albums
1959 debut albums
EMI Columbia Records albums
Albums produced by Norrie Paramor

British rock-and-roll albums